Deendyal Upadhyay (born 15 July 1999) is an Indian cricketer. He made his first-class debut for Arunachal Pradesh in the 2018–19 Ranji Trophy on 14 December 2018. He was the leading wicket-taker for Arunachal Pradesh in the tournament, with 23 dismissals in four matches. He made his Twenty20 debut for Arunachal Pradesh in the 2018–19 Syed Mushtaq Ali Trophy on 28 February 2019.

References

External links
 

1999 births
Living people
Indian cricketers
Arunachal Pradesh cricketers
Place of birth missing (living people)